Reuben Harold Tweten (March 15, 1899 – May 12, 1986) was an American politician and farmer.

Tweten was born in Reynolds, North Dakota and went to business college in Minneapolis, Minnesota. He grew up in McIntosh, Minnesota and then lived in Fosston, Polk County, Minnesota, with his wife and family. Tweten was a farmer and cattle breeder and was involved in the Polk County Fair. He served in the Minnesota House of Representatives from 1947 to 1956. He died at Fosston Memorial Hospital in Fosston, Minnesota.

References

1899 births
1986 deaths
People from Reynolds, North Dakota
People from Polk County, Minnesota
Farmers from Minnesota
Members of the Minnesota House of Representatives